"Vuoto a perdere" is Noemi's fifth single, released in Italy on 28 January 2011. Produced by Celso Valli and written by Vasco Rossi and Gaetano Curreri, it is the lead single from Noemi's second studio album, RossoNoemi, released on 22 March 2011.

Track listing
Digital download

Music video
The music video for "Vuoto a perdere", starring Serena Autieri and Carla Signoris, was directed by Fausto Brizzi and is the first Noemi video to be filmed in 3-D. It was released on 29 January 2011 on the website of the Italian version of the magazine Vanity Fair.

Soundtrack
"Vuoto a perdere" is included in the soundtrack of the sequel of the film Maschi contro femmine, titled Femmine contro maschi and directed by Fausto Brizzi.

Charts

Personnel
 Noemi – vocals
 Celso Valli – producer, piano, keyboards, strings, strings direction, arrangement
 Massimo Varini – electric guitar, acoustic guitar
 Cesare Chiodo – bass
 Paolo Valli – drums
 Samuele Dessi – programming
 Celso Valli Ensemble Orchestra – strings
Source:

References

2011 singles
Noemi (singer) songs
Italian-language songs
2011 songs
Songs written by Vasco Rossi